Laura Ranwell (born 13 December 1941) is a South African former swimmer. She competed in the women's 100 metre backstroke at the 1960 Summer Olympics.

References

1941 births
Living people
South African female swimmers
Olympic swimmers of South Africa
Swimmers at the 1960 Summer Olympics
Swimmers from Johannesburg